Sanchai Ratiwatana and Sonchat Ratiwatana won the title, defeating Chen Ti and Franko Škugor in the final 6–4, 2–6, [11–9]  .

Seeds

Draw

Draw

References
 Main Draw

Kobe Challenger - Doubles